The 2013 Texas A&M Aggies women's soccer team represents Texas A&M University in the 2012 NCAA Division I women's college soccer season. The Aggies are led by G. Guerrieri, who has coached the team since the program's inception in 1993 (21 years).

The 2013 team has 22 roster players, with 14 scholarships to utilize between them.

2013 schedule

Lineup/formation
4–3–3 shown
Mouseover names for stats

Roster/statistics
Starters highlighted in green

Season review

Non-conference

Conference

NCAA tournament

Accolades/notes

References

External links

Official website

Texas A&M Aggies women's soccer seasons
Texas AandM